Manuel Nkomba was ruler of the Portuguese vassal of the Kingdom of Kongo from 1910 until 1911, when he died after only a year on the throne, which was possibly why he was excluded from the title of Manuel III, which was given to his successor Manuel III. He was the son of King Pedro VI.

Manikongo of Kongo
Year of birth missing
1911 deaths